Nick West (born March 19, 1997) is an American soccer player who most recently played as a midfielder for Stumptown Athletic in the NISA.

Career

College & Amateur
West played four years of college soccer at Messiah College in Pennsylvania between 2015 and 2018. In 2018, he was the nation's leading scorer with 30 goals and 6 assists in just 23 appearances.

Professional
In August 2019, West signed for NISA side Stumptown Athletic ahead of the league's inaugural season.

References

External links
 Profile at Messiah College Athletics
 Stumptown Athletic profile

1997 births
Living people
American soccer players
Association football midfielders
Stumptown AC players
National Independent Soccer Association players
Soccer players from New York (state)
People from East Hampton (town), New York
Sportspeople from Suffolk County, New York
Messiah Falcons men's soccer players